Maurice Langlois (31 January 1860 – 10 June 1948) was a French philatelist who signed the Roll of Distinguished Philatelists in 1923.

Selected publications
Catalogue des estampilles et marques postales d'Alsace et de Lorraine 1698 a 1870. Yvert & Cie, Amiens, 1937. (With Gerard Gilbert)

References

Signatories to the Roll of Distinguished Philatelists
1860 births
1948 deaths
French philatelists